Spike is the surname of:

 John Spike (born 1951), American art historian, curator and author
 Michèle Kahn Spike, American lawyer, historian, and prominent lay figure in the Episcopalian church
 Paul Spike, American author, editor and journalist
 Robert W. Spike (1923–1966), American clergyman, theologian and civil rights leader

See also
 Spike (nickname)
 Spikes (surname)